XHETU-FM (branded as Vida Romántica) is a Mexican Spanish-language radio station serving Tampico, Tamaulipas as well as Tuxpan and Poza Rica, Veracruz.

History

XETU-AM received its concession in November 1943. Originally operating on 1460 kHz, XETU moved to 980 by the 1960s and increased its daytime power to 10,000 watts.

XETU moved to FM in 2010 as XHETU-FM 99.3.

References

Radio stations in Tampico